Collix mesopora is a moth in the  family Geometridae. It is found on the Borneo, the Philippines and Sulawesi.

References

Moths described in 1932
mesopora